The Zwiefacher is a southern German folk dance with a quick tempo and changing beat patterns.

Location 
The Zwiefacher is danced primarily in Bavaria, especially Lower Bavaria, Hallertau and Upper Palatinate; it is also known in the Black Forest, Austria, Alsace, the Czech Republic and Sudetenland.

Name 
The first documented usage of the word Zwiefach was in 1780. It loosely translates as "two times" or "double". Although this may be indicative of the two different time signatures, it is believed that the title refers to the couple being tightly wound against each other, a departure from earlier traditions. 
The dance is still known by various other names in different regions, such as Schweinauer, Schleifer, Übern Fuaß, Mischlich, Grad und Ungrad, Neu-Bayerischer and, above all Bairischer (meaning Farmer Dance a name sometimes confused with the Bavarian Polka).

The number of different names for the same dance should not be surprising, the dance is older than the modern German language. Nor should one be surprised that the tunes themselves have multiple names. One German dance researcher, Felix Hoerburger, catalogued 112 different Zwiefacher tunes with 474 different names.

Rhythm
The Zwiefacher alternates between odd and even time signatures, changing from 3 to 2 beats per bar. The changes may occur regularly - for example, two measures per time signature, may change only once or may change irregularly throughout. Early Zwiefachers were played before the modern bar line was invented.

Choreography 
The couple turns very quickly in a closed position, similar to the Waltz. Physically, the rhythmic shift looks like a change from normal waltz steps to drehersteps (pivots), occasionally also to polkasteps.

Lyrics 
Lyrics were often created as a mnemonic device to help learn Zwiefachers melodies by heart. This led to many songtexts for the same melodies. New lyrics are still sometimes used together with old melodies, as in the McDonald's parody "Hunger kriag I glei" by "Bayrisch-Diatonischer Jodelwahnsinn" which uses the same music as the Suserl-Zwiefache.

Examples in European classical music

 Carl Orff composed one dance of his Carmina Burana in the Zwiefacher form.
 The Furiant in Act Two of Bedřich Smetana's The Bartered Bride is a variant of the Zwiefacher.
 In Telemann's “Kleine Kammermusik” of 1716, in the B-flat major suite, Aria 6 is a Zwiefacher.

Examples
Eisenkeilnest (https://www.dancilla.com/wiki/index.php/Eisenkeilnest)
S'Luada (https://www.dancilla.com/wiki/index.php/S%27Luada)
Wiggerl Zwiefacher sheet music (http://www.folkloretanznoten.de/Wiggerl_Zwiefacher.pdf)
Lercherl Zwiefacher (see the external links section)

See also
Austrian folk dances
Austrian folk dancing
Waltz
Ländler
Schuhplattler
German Wikipedia Zwiefacher page

References

External links
http://www.germandance.org/zwiefache.html (dance style/flow, spelling, pronunciation, noun endings) Archive from 2008.
http://www.dancilla.com (videos, MIDI files, descriptions - in German)
https://web.archive.org/web/20060908030203/http://www.phantomranch.net/folkdanc/dances/zwiefach.htm (dance notes)
http://www.folkdancing.com/Pages/seattle/Zwie-Pattern.html (a list of over 200 recorded Zwiefacher dance patterns)
http://www.stammtischmusik.at/noten/zwiefache.htm (sheet music, lyrics, dance patterns, and videos for 53 Zwiefacher)
http://www.germanfolkdancers.org/ (history, spelling, definition)
http://ballibre.org/ Creative Commons Zwiefache on BalLibre.org

 European folk dances
 German folk dances
 Austrian folk dances